Radio is an English language song by Danny Saucedo and the first single from his studio album Set Your Body Free. The song was released in 2008 and was written by Michel Zirton, Tobias Gustavsson and Saucedo himself.

The song entered the Swedish Singles Chart on 13 November 2008, reaching number one on 4 December 2008 and staying at that position for an additional week. The song spent a total of 11 weeks on the chart.

Charts

Weekly charts

Year-end charts

References

2009 singles
Number-one singles in Sweden
2008 songs
Sony Music singles
Songs written by Danny Saucedo
Danny Saucedo songs